Davide Matteini (born 11 May 1982) is an Italian footballer.

Career
Matteini started his career at Empoli.

Palermo
After loaned to Serie C1 and Serie C2 clubs, he was signed by Palermo in January 2003, in joint-ownership bid, for €620,000. He just played once for Palermo in Serie B.

Matteini then left on loan to Serie B and Serie C1 clubs. After he scored the career high in Serie B with 9 goals, he was loaned back to Empoli, which still hold half of his contractual rights. He played his first Serie A games against U.C. Sampdoria, 10 September 2006. He played 19 starts in 2006–07 Serie A.

Parma
In June 2007, Palermo got full contractual rights from Empoli for €330,000, but sold to Parma F.C. in join-ownership in August 2007 for €0.9 million. The deal offset the installment payments of 2006 signing of Mark Bresciano and Fábio Simplício. Parma also signed Igor Budan and Francesco Parravicini from Palermo earlier in July. He was signed by Vicenza on 31 January 2008 along with Ascoli winger Giampietro Perrulli. Matteini made 14 starts in the second half of 2007–08 Serie B.

Rimini
In January 2009, he left for Rimini for €1 million (nominal value) from Parma, with Palermo retained 50% registration rights. Parma also got Francesco Lunardini (€1 million) and Daniele Vantaggiato (€1.9 million) from Rimini as part of the deal. Rimini reached the promotion playoffs in 2009–10 Lega Pro Prima Divisione but lost it. In June 2010 Palermo gave up the remain 50% registration rights but the Rimini soon bankrupted.

Late career
Matteini remained in the third division in 2010–11 season for Cosenza. However the team also bankrupted and Matteini joined Reggiana.

In October 2013 Matteini was signed by Tuttocuoio.

In January 2014 goes to Viareggio, while in September goes to San Paolo Padova in Serie D.

Savona - Teramo matchfixing

On August 20, 2015 the player earned 3 years and 6 months ban for sports fraud by Italian Federation 1st degree judges. He allegedly participated in the matchfixing of Savona - Teramo and then bet on the match result.

References

External links
   Davide Matteini on Tuttocalciatori.net

Italian footballers
Empoli F.C. players
A.S. Gualdo Casacastalda players
Palermo F.C. players
U.S. Livorno 1915 players
Calcio Padova players
F.C. Crotone players
Delfino Pescara 1936 players
Parma Calcio 1913 players
L.R. Vicenza players
Rimini F.C. 1912 players
Cosenza Calcio players
A.C. Reggiana 1919 players
A.C. Tuttocuoio 1957 San_Miniato players
Serie A players
Serie B players
Serie C players
Serie D players
Association football forwards
Sportspeople from Livorno
1982 births
Living people
Footballers from Tuscany